The 12th Nuestra Belleza México pageant, was held at the Antiguo Taller de Locomotoras of Aguascalientes, Aguascalientes, Mexico on September 2, 2005. Thirty-three contestants of the Mexican Republic competed for the national title, which was won by Priscila Perales from Nuevo León, who later competed in Miss Universe 2006 in United States where she was a Semifinalist in the Top 10. Perales was crowned by outgoing Nuestra Belleza México titleholder Laura Elizondo. She was the third Neoleonesa to win this title.

The Nuestra Belleza Mundo México title was won by Karla Jiménez from Puebla, who later competed in Miss World 2006 in Poland where she was a Semifinalist in the Top 17. Jiménez was crowned by outgoing Nuestra Belleza Mundo México titleholder Dafne Molina. She was the second Poblana to win this title.

This year established the "Reina de Un Millón", a new prize structure that encourages more quality and participation of young Mexican and get the public's interest for our representatives at international events.

The recognition "Corona al Mérito 2005" was for Blanca Soto, Nuestra Belleza Mundo México 1997, Miss Verano Viña del Mar 1997 and International Top Model.

Results

Placements

Order of announcements

Top 10
Jalisco
Guanajauto
Veracruz
Baja California Sur
Zacatecas
Tamaulipas
Puebla
Baja California
Nuevo León
Distrito Federal

Top 5
Jalisco
Baja California Sur
Tamaulipas
Puebla
Nuevo León

Preliminary Competition
For the third consecutive time, the Preliminary Competition was held at the "Hoy" TV Show a few days before to final competition. Prior to the final telecast, all contestants competed in swimsuit during the preliminary competition, included corporal expression category.

In this program were chosen the Top 20 among the 33 candidates. Only the top 20 participated in the final night. The Preliminary Competition was hosted by Andrea Legarreta and Ernesto Laguardia.

Order of announcements
In addition, the names of the semifinalists who would compete on the final night they met.

Yucatán
Baja California
Puebla
Baja California Sur
Tamaulipas
Jalisco
Baja California Sur
Zacatecas
Puebla
Tamaulipas

Durango
Baja California
Distrito Federal
Guanajuato
Quintana Roo
Veracruz
Distrito Federal
Morelos
Aguascalientes
Nuevo León

Special awards

Judges

Preliminary Competition
Blanca Soto - Nuestra Belleza Mundo México 1997 and International Top Model
Carlos Moreno - TV Producer
Cecilia Gabriela - Actress
Lissete Trepaud - OCESA Fashion Manager
José Quiñones - Fashion Coordinator
Fefi Mauri - Director of Modeling Agency
Gustavo Elguera - Designer Accessories

Final Competition
Barbára Rubin - Image Coordinator
Alfonso Waithsman - Makeup Artist
Leticia Murray - Nuestra Belleza México 1999
Luis Escoy - Plastic Surgeon
Laura de la Torre - Fuller Brand Director
Alán Loranga - Psychotherapist
Silvia Pinal - Actress & TV Producer
Juan José Origel - Journalist & TV Host
Silvia Salgado - Nuestra Belleza México 1998
Adrián Sánchez - Employer

Background music
Elefante

Contestants

Designates

 - Marcela Rubio
 - Irina Trasviña
 - Ana Isabel Muñoz
 Distrito Federal - Stephanie Pavlovich
 - Angela Sandoval

 - Ana Paola Sifuentes
 - Irantzú Herrero
 - Ana Patricia González
 - Julia Muñoz

Returning states

Last competed in 2002:

Last competed in 2003:

 Estado de México

Withdrawals

Significance
Nuevo León won the Nuestra Belleza México title for the third time (before 1997 and 1998).
Puebla won the Nuestra Belleza Mundo México title for the second time (before 2002).
Baja California Sur was the Suplente/1st Runner-up for the first time.
For the third time an Afro-Mexican compete in the Nuestra Belleza México pageant (Cindy Cajuste from Veracruz, before 1999 and 2001).
For the first time Chihuahua retires from competition.
Aguascalientes, Estado de México, Puebla, Yucatán and Zacatecas return to competition after two years (2003), and Morelos, Puebla, Querétaro and Quintana Roo after three years (2002).
Tamaulipas placed for seventh consecutive year.
Distrito Federal, Jalisco and Nuevo León placed for third consecutive year.
Zacatecas placed for second consecutive year.
Baja California Sur and Quintana Roo returned to making calls to the semifinals after five years (2000), Morelos after three years (2002), Aguascalientes, Baja California, Durango, Guanajuato, Puebla, Zacatecas and Yucatán after two years (2003).
States that were called to the semifinals last year and this year failed to qualify were Coahuila, Michoacán and Veracruz.
For third consecutive time Ernesto Laguardia hosted Nuestra Belleza México, second time with Silvia Salgado and for the first time with Jacqueline Bracamontes, Paulina Flores, Vilma Zamora and Tania Vázquez.
Baja California Sur won Miss Top Model for the first time.
Puebla won Miss Talent for the first time.
Yucatán won the Academic Award for the first time.
Tamaulipas won Contestants' Choice award for the first time.
Baja California won Miss Sports for the first time.
Nuevo León won Miss Photogenic for third time (before 1997 and 1998).
Guanajuato won the Best Hair Award for the first time.
Nuevo León won Fuller Beauty Queen Award for second time (before 2003).
Distrito Federal won the Skin Hinds Award for the first time.
The host delegate, Vanessa Castro from Aguascalientes, placed to semifinals.
Baja California Sur  (Daniela Cosio) and Distrito Federal (Priscila González) are the higher delegates in this edition (1.80 m).
Aguascalientes (Vanessa Castro) and Quintana Roo (Erika Argüello) are the lower delegates in this edition (1.68 m).

Contestants notes
 - Vanessa Castro after participated she studied at CEA and she appeared on TV Show "Todo el Mundo Cree que Sabe" as Vanessa de Castro.
 - Daniela Cosio is cousin of Berenice Cosio Nuestra Belleza Baja California Sur 2001. She signed with Major Model Management in New York City and Milan. After acquiring representation, Cosio's modeling portfolio quickly began to expand, and she appeared in international edition of Vogue and Maxim Magazine. As a runway model, she has walked the catwalks for designers such as Marchesa, Guess?, Baby Phat, Chado Ralph Rucci, Mara Hoffman, Project Runway, Georges Hobeika, Iceberg, Marithé François Girbaud, Vivienne Westwood, Betsey Johnson, and Pamella Roland. In 2010 Cosio was featured in Pantene Shine Satisfaction Commercial. Also she represented Mexico in the Reinado Internacional del Café 2006 in Manizales, Colombia. In 2010 Cosio was featured in Pantene Shine Satisfaction Commercial.
 - Natalia Pérez represented Mexico in Miss Atlántico Internacional 2007 but she didn't place.
 - Daniel Ortíz is the local coordinator of Nuestra Belleza Nayarit.
 - Priscila Perales in 2004 participated in her state's pageant Nuestra Belleza Nuevo León and placed 1st Runner-up. Perales competed for the state title again the following year and win the title, becoming her state's representative at the National Competition in 2005, subsequently won the Nuestra Belleza México title. Perales represented her country in Miss Universe 2006, held at the Shrine Auditorium in Los Angeles, California, United States on July 23, 2006. She placed in the Top 10, competing in swimsuit and evening gown. In 2007, after the Nuestra Belleza México organization reobtained the franchise for Miss International, Perales was chosen to be the country's representative in that pageant, held at The Hotel Prince Park Tower in Tokyo, Japan, on October 15, 2007. She was crowned Miss International 2007, becoming Mexico's first representative to win that title. During filming in summer 2010, she starred in Univision's hit soap opera, "Eva Luna", alongside Guy Ecker, Blanca Soto, Susana Dosamantes, Julian Gil, and other actors. In 2012 she appears in the soap opera "Corazón Valiente".
 - Karla Jiménez obtained the title of Nuestra Belleza Mundo México and she represented her country in Miss World 2006 held at Sala Kongresowa, the main 2,897-seat auditorium at the Palace of Culture and Science in Warsaw, Poland on September 30, 2006. During Miss World, she made the Top 17 Semifinalists. On June 28, 2009 she married with Luis de Llano Stevens, son of producer Luis de Llano.
 - Alondra Robles after one year she was elected Miss Turismo Sinaloa as well as Miss Turismo México 2006 and competed in Miss Tourism Queen International 2006 and Miss International 2006.
 - Ana Patricia González known as Ana Patricia Gámez at the time (prior to marriage), the 18-year-old represented the state of Sonora in the 2005 edition of Nuestra Belleza México. A few years later, González auditioned for Nuestra Belleza Latina 2010 in Los Angeles, and was selected to participate in that reality show. After weeks of competition and eliminations, she won the grand prize of USD $250,000, a contract with Univision and the title Nuestra Belleza Latina 2010, making her the second Mexican woman to obtain the title, after Alejandra Espinoza in 2007. She also won the 50 Mas Bellos challenge and was featured among People en Español magazine's 50 most beautiful people of 2010.
 - Cindy Cajuste was 1st Runner-up in Miss Costa Maya International 2006. She was the third Afro-Mexican to compete in tue Nuestra Belleza México pageant.
 - Mariana Ancona is daughter of Ana María García Srita. Turismo Nacional 1980 and Srita. América Latina 1980 who was also the Local Director of Nuestra Belleza Yucatán.
 - Diana Jiménez was selected by Nuestra Belleza México Organization for represent Mexico in the first Miss Continente Americano held in Palacio de Cristal in Guayaquil, Ecuador on 2006, but she didn't place.

Crossovers

Contestants who had competed or will compete at other beauty pageants:

Miss Universe
 2006: : Priscila Perales (Top 10)

Miss World
 2006: : Karla Jiménez (Top 17)

Miss International
 2006: : Alondra Robles
 2007: : Priscila Perales (Winner)

Miss Continente Americano
 2006: : Diana Jiménez

Miss Atlántico Internacional
2007: : Natalia Pérez

Nuestra Belleza Latina
 2010: : Ana Patricia Gámez (Winner)
 's representative

Miss Tourism Queen International
 2006: : Alondra Robles

Reinado Internacional del Café
 2006: : Daniela Cosio

Miss Costa Maya International
 2006: : Cindy Cajuste (1st Runner-up)

Miss Turismo México
 2006: : Alondra Robles (Winner)

Nuestra Belleza Nuevo León
 2004: : Priscila Perales (Suplente)

References

External links
Official Website

.Mexico
2005 in Mexico
2005 beauty pageants